= Jonathan Shimshoni =

Israeli retired military official

Jonathan Shimshoni (Hebrew: יונתן שמשוני) is a retired Israeli military official. He served as a Brigadier General in the Israel Defense Forces (IDF) as the Director of Planning for the Planning Division. He has a PhD in Public Policy from the Princeton School of Public and International Affairs.
